is a Japanese short-track speed skater. He is known for being the first case of doping at the 2018 Winter Olympics after he was found to have been using acetazolamide.

References

1996 births
Japanese male short track speed skaters
Japanese sportspeople in doping cases
Living people
Doping cases in short track speed skating
Short track speed skaters at the 2012 Winter Youth Olympics